Beverley Noel Salmon  is an activist and former municipal politician in Toronto, Ontario, Canada. Salmon was a North York city and then Metro Toronto Councillor from 1985-1997. Salmon was awarded the Order of Ontario in 2016 and the Order of Canada in 2017.

Early life and education
Born in Toronto in the 1930s, Salmon was the daughter of Herbert Bell, a Jamaican immigrant, and Violet Bryan, a fifth generation Canadian of Scottish descent.  Salmon began her Registered Nursing training at Wellesley Hospital in 1950 and finished a certificate in Public Health Nursing at the University of Toronto in 1954. She was a Victorian Order Nurse (VON) in Toronto from 1954-1956. Salmon married Dr.(John) Douglas Salmon in 1956 and the couple had four children.

Community work 
Salmon was a founding member of the Toronto Urban Alliance on Race Relations (UARR) which was established in 1975, among the rise of racial tensions in Toronto. She worked closely with other UARR members, including Dr. Wilson A. Head and Jean Augustine, and served on the Media Committee and the Board of Directors.

Career
After completing her training, Salmon started her nursing career in Detroit, Michigan, in 1956. While in the city she had the opportunity to hear leaders of the civil rights movement such as Martin Luther King Jr., and was inspired on her return to Toronto to become involved in civil rights activism.

Salmon was the founding chair of the Toronto Board of Education's Black Liaison Committee, where she worked to institute anti-racism training for teachers and increase coverage of Black history in the curriculum. She was a co-founder of the Urban Alliance on Race Relations and was the Ontario Human Rights Commission's first Black female commissioner.

Salmon first ran for elected office in the 1976 municipal election as alderman for Ward 8 on North York Council losing to Alan Milliken Heisey Sr.
Salmon ran again as councillor for Ward 8 in the 1985 municipal election defeating Andy Borins. Borins had been removed from office as Ward 8 councillor during the previous term by a court order due to a court  application made by Barbara Greene. She was Toronto's first female black City councillor. She served as a Toronto Transit Commission Board member for the years 1989-1994 and was Vice Chair of the Board in the years 1991-1994.

Salmon continued as a Metro Toronto councillor until her retirement in 1997.

Awards and honours
In 1995, Salmon won the Excellence in Politics award at the 1995 African Canadian Achievement Awards. In 1999, Salmon was on the Federation of Canadian Municipalities's honour roll. 
Salmon was also awarded Queen Elizabeth II's Diamond Jubilee Medal in 2012, the Order of Ontario in 2016 and became a member of the Order of Canada in 2017.

External links
 Beverley Salmon's archives are held at the Clara Thomas Archives and Special Collections, York University Libraries, Toronto, Ontario

References

1930s births
Living people
Black Canadian politicians
Black Canadian women
Canadian people of Jamaican descent
Canadian nurses
Canadian women nurses
Members of the Order of Ontario
Members of the Order of Canada
Metropolitan Toronto councillors
University of Toronto alumni